Omar Josué Rudberg (né González; born 12 November 1998) is a Venezuelan-Swedish singer and actor. Before launching his solo music career in 2018, he gained recognition and began his professional music career in 2013 as a member of the Swedish boy band FO&O. He is best known internationally for his starring role as Simon Eriksson in the Netflix teen series Young Royals (2021–present).

Early life 
Omar Josué Rudberg was born as Omar Josué González on November 12, 1998 in Venezuela. As a six-year-old, he moved to Sweden with his mother Wilnur, who had then married his Swedish stepfather Thomas Rudberg, from whom he took his surname.

Career 
In 2010, Rudberg participated in the fourth season of the talent show Talang, the Swedish version of Got Talent. Rudberg began his professional music career in 2013 as a member of the Swedish boy band FO&O. In 2017, after four years of performing together, winning eight and getting 12 nominations for different music awards, being awarded with 2 Platinum and 1 Gold certifications, over 80 million streams on Spotify, participating in Melodifestivalen 2017, selling out several shows, and opening for Justin Bieber and One Direction, the band announced that band members were going to focus on their own separate solo projects in the future.

Rudberg started his solo music career in 2018, with the single "Que Pasa" featuring Lamix, followed by "La Mesa" featuring Elias Hurtig in August of the same year. In February 2019, he released the single "Om om och om igen" after participating with the song in Melodifestivalen 2019. The song became his first solo top 20 hit in Sweden on Sverigetopplistan. In 2020, he released the single "Dum", followed by the songs "Jag e nån annan" and "Läppar".

In November 2020, it was announced that Rudberg had been cast in the Netflix coming-of-age series Young Royals. It was later revealed that Rudberg found out he got the role of Simon on August 20, 2020. In July 2021, the first season of Young Royals debuted on Netflix. Alongside the series, he released the EP "Omar Covers", featuring the covers of the songs his character Simon sings in the show. In 2021, Rudberg also released the single "Alla ba ouff" and its Spanish version "Yo dije ouff".

In May 2022, Rudberg released his first solo album OMR, which featured the single he released at the beginning of the same year "Mi casa su casa", and the song "Moving Like That" with which he participated in Melodifestivalen 2022. In June 2022, he released the single "Nakna" with Victoria Nadine, followed by "Todo De Ti (All That She Wants)" in July.

In November 2022, the second season of Young Royals debuted on Netflix. Alongside the season, he released the single "Simon's Song", the original song written for the show. 

In December 2022, it was announced that Rudberg had been cast as Dante in his first feature film, Karusell, which will be released in October 2023. In January 2023, he released the single "Call Me By Your Name" featuring Claudia Neuser.

Personal life 
In June 2019, Rudberg came out as a member of the LGBTQ+ community during an interview for the Swedish LGBTQ+ magazine QX: "Most of the time people just want to know because they're curious. Why should I tell someone about my sexuality who just wants to know, for the sake of knowing? I don't have a 'label'. As a person, I'm very open-minded. I dare not put a title. It feels so damn scary. Sometimes I hang out with guys, sometimes with girls. It varies. I don't know if it's because of my age, that I'm still young. I feel lost, not in a bad way, but just lost in life."

In August 2021, he once again expressed his wish to not label his sexuality, saying that he falls in love with the person regardless of the person’s sex. He also talked about how much LGBTQ+ pride means to him.

Discography

Studio albums

Extended plays

Singles

Filmography

Film

Television

Awards and nominations

References

External links 

 
 
 
 
 
 

1998 births
Living people
English-language singers from Sweden
Swedish LGBT actors
Venezuelan LGBT actors
LGBT male actors
Swedish LGBT singers
Venezuelan LGBT singers
People from Kungsbacka Municipality
Spanish-language singers of Sweden
Swedish-language singers
Swedish male television actors
Talang (Swedish TV series) contestants
Venezuelan emigrants to Sweden
Venezuelan male television actors
20th-century LGBT people
21st-century LGBT people
21st-century Swedish male actors
21st-century Swedish male singers
21st-century Venezuelan male actors
21st-century Venezuelan male singers
Melodifestivalen contestants of 2022
Melodifestivalen contestants of 2019
Melodifestivalen contestants of 2017